The Radiators are an Australian pub rock band formed in September 1978. Mainstay members are Brian Nichol on lead vocals, Stephen "Fess" Parker on guitar and Geoff Turner on bass. In 1989 they were joined by Mark Lucas on drums. Their most popular albums are Feel the Heat (March 1980) and Scream of the Real (May 1983), which both peaked in the top 25 of the Australian Kent Music Report Albums Chart. Their best known songs are "Comin' Home", "No Tragedy" and "Gimme Head". Rock music historian, Ian McFarlane described the group as "an archetypal, hard-working pub-rock band capable of delivering tightly crafted, well-executed, hard-hitting metal-pop anthems backed by a playful sense of humour. The band toured constantly, racking up over 2500 gigs by the early 1990s".

History
The Radiators were formed in Western Sydney in September 1978 as a pub rock band with Brendan Callinan on keyboards and vocals, Brian Nichol on lead vocals, Stephen "Fess" Parker on guitar, Chris Tagg on drums and Geoff Turner on bass. Nichol and Parker grew up in Bega where they attended the local high school. They formed a local group, Undecided, and in 1969 they relocated to Sydney. Callinan, Nichol, Parker and Tagg were all ex-members of hard rockers, Big Swifty which had formed in 1975. Turner had been in Twister which had issued two singles in 1977 before disbanding. The Radiators signed with WEA Records and issued their debut single, "Comin' Home" in September 1979. It peaked at No. 33 on the Australian Kent Music Report Singles Chart. A second single, "Fess' Song/Gimme Head" was released in February 1980. In March 1980 the group released their first album, Feel the Heat, which was produced by Charles Fisher (Radio Birdman, Ol' 55). They supported the Australian leg of a tour by United Kingdom rock group, The Police.

In 1981 Powderworks Records released Up for Grabs in August, which reached the top 40. The Radiators signed with EMI Records and, in May 1983, released the album, Scream of the Real, which peaked at No. 15 on the Australian Kent Music Report Albums Chart. That month its lead single, "No Tragedy" reached the top 30. In 1984 they released Life's a Gamble, which became their third platinum album. In June Tagg was replaced on drums by Mick Buckley. The group toured constantly, averaging 200 gigs a year and by 1985 had performed an estimated 1500 times, Turner explained, "Your fingers and throat start hurting ... It's a bit of a grind and it seems never-ending... [but] there's nothing else we'd rather do than play rock and roll. I can't imagine life without the Rads".

In late 1986, they signed with Mercury Records and released Nasty Habits in Nice Children in March 1987, which was produced by Peter Blyton (Chain). That June, Buckley was replaced on drums by Brad Heaney. Heaney was replaced in turn by Mark Lucas and then in 1988 Callinan left without being replaced. In January 1989 Heaney was a founding member of hard rock group, The Screaming Jets.

By the early 1990s, the band's "boogie rock" style was outmoded and Turner noted that media referred to their fans as "mindless yobbos from the west". However, rock music author, James Cockington, felt "[p]art of their appeal is their refusal to change their style, so that a 1978 gig and a 1998 gig are strangely similar experiences". Further albums include  Radiators (October 1993), Stone (September 1995), In the Roar (1997) and Smoke and Mirrors (2000). In 2001 veteran Australian guitarist Ted Mulry was diagnosed with terminal brain cancer and a series of tribute concerts, Gimme Ted, were organised. The Radiators' performance on 10 March was recorded with seven-tracks issued on a 2× DVD as Gimme Ted – The Ted Mulry Benefit Concerts by Various Artists (2003).

The Radiators appeared in the Countdown Spectacular 2 concert series in Australia between late-August and early-September 2007. They sang two songs including "Comin' Home", which was issued on the associated 3× CD set, Countdown Spectacular Live – Volume Two (2007).

According to the band's website, as of 2008, the line up of Lucas, Nichol, Parker and Turner celebrated the group's 30th anniversary and toured throughout Australia. In June 2009 they performed at the 31st Annual Golden Stave Charity Luncheon at Sydney's Hordern Pavilion. Rock music historian, Ian McFarlane described the group as "an archetypal, hard-working pub-rock band capable of delivering tightly crafted, well-executed, hard-hitting metal-pop anthems backed by a playful sense of humour. The band toured constantly, racking up over 2500 gigs by the early 1990s".

Aside from his work with The Radiators, Lucas has taught drumming since the mid-1980s including students with attention deficit hyperactivity disorder (ADHD). As of 2008, Callinan is a sales and marketing manager of Roland Corporation and an executive committee member of Support Act Limited. In May 2008, Buckley was a member of country music group, The Yeehaa Boys – alongside Steve Balbi (Noiseworks) – which issued a self-titled album.

Members

Current Lineup
 Brian Nichol – lead vocals (1978–present)
 Martin Cilia – guitar (2021–present)
 Geoff Turner – bass (1978–present)
 Mark Lucas – drums (1989–present)

Past Members
 Brendan Callinan – keyboards (1978–1988)
 Stephen "Fess" Parker – guitar (1978–2013)
 Chris Tagg – drums (1978–1984)
 Mick Buckley – drums (1984–1987)
 Brad Heaney – drums (1987–1988)
 Brent Dehn – guitar (2013–2021)

Timeline

Discography

Studio albums

Live albums

Compilation albums

Extended plays

Singles

Awards

Mo Awards
The Australian Entertainment Mo Awards (commonly known informally as the Mo Awards), were annual Australian entertainment industry awards. They recognise achievements in live entertainment in Australia from 1975 to 2016. The Radiators won two awards in that time.
 (wins only)
|-
| 2013
| The Radiators
| Best Rock Band/ Performer of the Year
| 
|-
| 2015
| The Radiators
| Rock Act of the Year 
| 
|-

References

General
 Note: Archived [on-line] copy has limited functionality.
Specific

External links
 

Australian rock music groups
Musical groups established in 1978
Musical groups from Sydney
Pub rock musical groups